While polygamous unions are unlawful under the Liberian civil code, such marriages are perfectly permissible under the Liberia's customary law.

Dynamics 
According to reports, polygamous marriages make up about one-third of all Liberian marriages. One third of married women in the age group 15-49, are in polygamous marriages.

Customary law allows men to have up to 4 wives. Customary law restricts a married woman's rights to inherit property from her spouse. When widowed, women are at the mercy of the customary laws that are not subject to the civil courts.

See also 
 Gender inequality in Liberia

References

Liberian culture
Liberia